USS Meredith (DD-165) was a  built for the United States Navy during World War I. She was the first destroyer in the United States Navy that named for a marine.

Description
The Wickes class was an improved and faster version of the preceding . Two different designs were prepared to the same specification that mainly differed in the turbines and boilers used. The ships built to the Bethlehem Steel design, built in the Fore River and Union Iron Works shipyards, mostly used Yarrow boilers that deteriorated badly during service and were mostly scrapped during the 1930s. They had a crew of 6 officers and 108 enlisted men.

Performance differed radically between the ships of the class, often due to poor workmanship. The Wickes class was powered by two steam turbines, each driving one propeller shaft, using steam provided by four water-tube boilers.

The ships were armed with four 4-inch (102 mm) guns in single mounts and were fitted with two  1-pounder guns for anti-aircraft defense. Their primary weapon, though, was their torpedo battery of a dozen 21 inch (533 mm) torpedo tubes in four triple mounts. In many ships a shortage of 1-pounders caused them to be replaced by 3-inch (76 mm) anti-aircraft (AA) guns. They also carried a pair of depth charge rails. A "Y-gun" depth charge thrower was added to many ships.

Construction and career
Meredith, named for Jonathan Meredith, was laid down 26 June 1918 by Fore River Shipbuilding Company, Quincy, Massachusetts; launched 22 September 1918; sponsored by Mrs. William F. Meredith, wife of the great-grandnephew of Sergeant Meredith; and commissioned at Boston 29 January 1919, Commander H. H. Michaels in command. Assigned to Destroyer Force, Atlantic Fleet, Meredith proceeded to Newport, Rhode Island, for torpedoes and 18 February began a shakedown cruise to Cuba. However, she received orders 22 February to join five other destroyers as escort to George Washington, returning President Woodrow Wilson from France to Boston. On 26 February, she resumed her shakedown.

Meredith departed New York 1 May for Trepassey Bay, Newfoundland, to serve as a guide post for the first transoceanic flight, as Navy Curtis flying boats spanned the Atlantic from Long Island to Plymouth, England. Returning to Boston 22 May, Meredith cruised the east and gulf coasts with Destroyer Flotilla 2 until November, then served out of Newport for training, particularly target practice, until November, when she went into repair at Norfolk.

Rejoining her division at Charleston, South Carolina, 26 January 1922, she participated in maneuvers until 5 April when she went into Philadelphia Navy Yard for inactivation. Decommissioned 28 June 1922, Meredith remained at Philadelphia until, in accordance with the London Naval Treaty, she was sold for scrapping 29 September 1936.

Notes

References

External links
 NavSource Photos

 

Wickes-class destroyers
Ships built in Quincy, Massachusetts
1918 ships